Puya raimondii, also known as queen of the Andes (English), titanka (Quechua) or puya de Raimondi (Spanish), is the largest species of bromeliad, its inflorescences reaching up to  in height. It is native to the high Andes of Bolivia and Peru. It was once hypothesized to be a Protocarnivorous plant.

Taxonomy 

However, as the plants he saw were immature and not yet flowering, he could not classify them taxonomically.

The species name of raimondii commemorates the 19th-century Italian scientist Antonio Raimondi, who immigrated to Peru and made extensive botanical expeditions there. He encountered this species in the region of Chavín de Huantar and published it as new to science under the name Pourretia gigantea in his 1874 book El Perú In 1928, the name was changed to Puya raimondii by the German botanist Hermann Harms, as the combination Puya gigantea was already used for a Chilean species.

Description  
The queen of the Andes is the largest species of bromeliad. A single plant can produce between 8,000  and 20,000  flowers in a 3-month period.

Its reproductive cycle (and life) lasts approximately 80 years, though one individual planted near sea level at the University of California Botanical Garden, bloomed in August 1986 after only 28 years. It is semelparous, dying after first reproduction.

The plant has been identified to form a close relationship with pollinating birds, and was even hypothesized to be a protocarnivorous plant due to its abilities to ensnare birds in the spiny fronds. However, the adaptations seen in Puya that lead to ensnarement of birds seems most likely to be instead a defense mechanism.

Distribution and habitat 
This species seem to be very specialist on site conditions as it prefers to grow in small areas even if the surrounding terrain may seem equally suitable, resulting in a patchy distribution of P. raimondii stands. Moreover, in spite of being a high altitude plant, it has thrived at near sea level in temperate climate.

Conservation status 
P. raimondii is considered an endangered species by the IUCN. The main threats to its survival are: human caused fires, climate change and a declining genetic diversity.

References

External links

 Photographs of Puya raimondii. Florida Council of Bromeliad Societies.

raimondii
Flora of Bolivia
Flora of Peru
Endangered plants
Ancash Region